Saint-Basile is a commune in the Ardèche department in southern France.  The commune consists of four hamlets: Saint-Basile, Mounens, Laprans, and Cluac.  A castle in the commune is owned by French comedian Yves Lecoq.

Population
Inhabitants of Saint-Basile are called Basilians.

See also
Communes of the Ardèche department

References

Communes of Ardèche
Ardèche communes articles needing translation from French Wikipedia